Saskal is a rural locality (a selo) in Saskalinsky Selsoviet of Shimanovsky District, Amur Oblast, Russia. The population was 502 as of 2018. There are 7 streets.

Geography 
Saskal is located on the Bereya River, 78 km southwest of Shimanovsk (the district's administrative centre) by road. Simonovo and Novogeorgiyevka are the nearest rural localities.

References 

Rural localities in Shimanovsky District